The Football World Championship Under 19 at the 2015 CPISRA World Games was the world championship for men's national 7-a-side association football under 19 teams. IFCPF stands for International Federation of Cerebral Palsy Football. Athletes with a physical disability competed. The Championship took place in the England from 10 to 16  August 2015. Football CP Football was played with modified FIFA rules. Among the modifications were that there were seven players, no offside, a smaller playing field, and permission for one-handed throw-ins. Matches consisted of two thirty-minute halves, with a fifteen-minute half-time break.

Participating teams and officials

Qualifying

The draw
During the draw, the teams were divided into pots because of rankings. Here, the following groups:

Squads

Group A

Group B

Venues
The venues to be used for the World Championships were located in Nottingham.

Format

The first round, or group stage, was a competition between the 16 teams divided among four groups of four, where each group engaged in a round-robin tournament within itself. The two highest ranked teams in each group advanced to the knockout stage for the position one to sixteen. the two lower ranked teams plays for the positions 17 to 32. Teams were awarded three points for a win and one for a draw. When comparing teams in a group over-all result came before head-to-head.

In the knockout stage there were three rounds (quarter-finals, semi-finals, and the final). The winners plays for the higher positions, the losers for the lower positions. For any match in the knockout stage, a draw after 60 minutes of regulation time was followed by two 10 minute periods of extra time to determine a winner. If the teams were still tied, a penalty shoot-out was held to determine a winner.

Classification
Athletes with a physical disability competed. The athlete's disability was caused by a non-progressive brain damage that affects motor control, such as cerebral palsy, traumatic brain injury or stroke. Athletes must be ambulant.

Players were classified by level of disability.
C5: Athletes with difficulties when walking and running, but not in standing or when kicking the ball.
C6: Athletes with control and co-ordination problems of their upper limbs, especially when running.
C7: Athletes with hemiplegia.
C8: Athletes with minimal disability; must meet eligibility criteria and have an impairment that has impact on the sport of football.

Teams must field at least one class C5 or C6 player at all times. No more than two players of class C8 are permitted to play at the same time.

Group stage
The first round, or group stage, have seen the sixteen teams divided into four groups of four teams.

Group A
<noinclude>

Group B
<noinclude>

Knockout stage

Semi-finals
Position 5-7

Position 1-4

Finals
Position 5-7

Position 3-4

Final

Statistics

Goalscorers
 7 goals
  Hudson Hyure Do Carmo Januario
  Dale Smith

 6 goals
  Weslley De Souza Mendes

 5 goals

  Soslan Gazdanov
  Sergei Materukhin
  Oliver Nugent
  Igor Romero Da Rocha

 4 goals

  Alesson De Oliveira Silva
  Kyle Hannin
  Matthew Hearne

 3 goals

  Job Draaijers
  Harm Pannerman
  Reece Macmillan
  Krist Stoelwinder

 2 goals

  Gerard Bambacht
  Reiss Blackwell
  Alexei Borkin
  Malik De La Cruz Victoria
  Temma Inoue
  Jamie Mitchell
  Bruno Pratis Da Silva
  Bruno Rodrigues Da Silva
  Aslan Tibilov
  Tatsuhiro Ura

 1 goal

  Darren Aitken
  Gordon Allan
  Joel Athey
  Joao Victor Batista Cortes
  Danila Belov
  Declan Docherty
  Harrison Dowdell
  Ryan Kinner
  Hayden Kroll
  Martijn Langras
  Alexandr Lipin
  Lewis McIntyre
  Robert Miller
  Ian Paton

 own goal
  Jeroen Duin

Ranking

See also

References

External links
 Official website from May, 3rd, 2016
 Cerebral Palsy International Sports & Recreation Association (CPISRA)
 International Federation of Cerebral Palsy Football (IFCPF)

2015 in association football
2015
2014–15 in English football
Paralympic association football
Football at the Cerebral Palsy Games